Ahmad Salek is an Iranian Shia cleric and conservative politician who was the former Member of the Parliament of Iran for the city of  Isfahan.

References

1946 births
Living people
Shia clerics from Isfahan
Members of the 1st Islamic Consultative Assembly
Members of the 3rd Islamic Consultative Assembly
Members of the 4th Islamic Consultative Assembly
Members of the 9th Islamic Consultative Assembly
Members of the 10th Islamic Consultative Assembly
Front of Islamic Revolution Stability politicians
Combatant Clergy Association politicians
Islamic Revolution Committees personnel
Islamic Revolutionary Guard Corps clerics
Politicians from Isfahan